The Queen Elizabeth II Coronation Award is an honour presented annually by the Royal Academy of Dance, to people who have made a significant contribution to the ballet and dance industry. The award was instituted by Dame Adeline Genee in 1953, to mark the coronation of Queen Elizabeth II and her appointment as Royal Patron of the Academy. The first winner of the award was Dame Ninette de Valois, founder of the Royal Ballet, Birmingham Royal Ballet and Royal Ballet School. The award has since been presented to a number of notable people, and is recognised as the highest honour awarded by the Academy.

Winners
The award was shared in 1963, 1966 and 2009, and in 2014 was awarded to a ballet company, rather than an individual. The full list of winners is:available at the RAD website.

1954 - Ninette de Valois
1955 - Tamara Karsavina
1956 - Marie Rambert
1957 - Anton Dolin
1958 - Phyllis Bedells
1959 - Frederick Ashton
1960 - Robert Helpmann
1961 - Ursula Moreton
1962 - Cyril Beaumont
1963 - Phillip J. S. Richardson (posthumously)
1963 - Alicia Markova
1964 - Kathleen Gordon
1965 - Peggy van Praagh
1966 - Serge Grigorieff
1966 - Lubov Tchernicheva
1967 - Lydia Sokolova
1968 - Stanislas Idzikowski
1969 - John Hart
1970 - John Gilpin
1971 - Louise Browne
1972 - Ruth French
1973 - Norman Morrice
1974 - Brian Shaw
1975 - Robin Howard
1976 - Pamela May
1977 - Winifred Edwards
1978 - Kenneth MacMillan
1979 - Arnold Haskell
1980 - Glen Tetley
1981 - Michael Somes
1982 - Merle Park
1983 - Rudolf Nureyev
1984 - Leslie Edwards
1985 - Antony Tudor
1986 - Rudolf Benesh
1986 - Joan Benesh
1987 - Peter Darrell
1988 - John Lanchbery
1989 - Mary Clarke
1990 - Peter Wright
1991 - Ivor Forbes Guest
1992 - Clement Crisp
1993 - Julia Farron
1994 - Anthony Dowell
1995 - Beryl Grey
1996 - Irina Baronova
1998 - Anya Linden, Lady Sainsbury
1999 - Maina Gielgud
2000 - Gillian Lynne
2003 - Princess Margaret, Countess of Snowdon (posthumously)
2005 - John Tooley
2007 - Alexander Grant
2009 - Victor Hochhauser
2009 - Lilian Hochhauser
2010 - Rachel Cameron
2011 - Monica Mason
2012 - Antoinette Sibley
2014 - The Royal Ballet
2016 - Matthew Bourne
2018 - Carlos Acosta
2019 - Karen Kain
2021 - David McAllister
2022 - Mikhail Baryshnikov

References

Dance awards
Awards established in 1953
English awards
1953 establishments in the United Kingdom
Coronation of Elizabeth II
Dance in the United Kingdom
British performing arts awards